Lega Alpina Lumbarda (Lombard Alpine League, LAL) was a left-wing regionalist political party in Italy, based in Lombardy. The party, an alternative to Lega Lombarda–Lega Nord, was led by Elidio De Paoli throughout its existence.

History
The party was founded in 1992 by De Paoli, a former blue-collar worker, local leader of the Marxist-Leninist League, and municipal councillor for the Greens in Brescia. De Paoli was elected senator both in the 1992 general election (when the party won 2.1% in Lombardy) and the 1994 general election (4.3%).

For the 1996 general election the party joined forces with Alleanza Lombarda Autonomia (a 1989 split from Lega Lombarda, led by Angela Bossi and Pierangelo Brivio, sister and brother-in-law of Umberto Bossi respectively), forming Lega per l'Autonomia – Alleanza Lombarda.

In 2009, Lega Alpina Lumbarda, led by De Paoli, filed lists in some Lombard provincial elections. The list gained everywhere less than 1%.

Popular support
The electoral results of the party in Lombardy are shown in the table below. For general elections the results always refer to the Senate.

References

1992 establishments in Italy
1996 disestablishments in Italy
Political parties established in 1992
Political parties disestablished in 1996
Political parties in Lombardy